Puspalal Sharma (born 8 November 1983) is a Bhutanese former international footballer. He made his first appearance for the Bhutan national football team in 2009.

References

1984 births
Bhutanese footballers
Bhutan international footballers
Transport United F.C. players
Living people
Association football goalkeepers
Bhutanese people of Nepalese descent